Cai Zelin (born 11 April 1991, in Huize, Yunnan) is a Chinese male racewalker. He finished 4th at the 20 km walk during the 2012 London Olympics, and won the silver medal at the 2016 Rio Olympics. He finished 5th at the 2015 World Championships in the 20 km race walk.  In 2019, he competed in the men's 20 kilometres walk at the 2019 World Athletics Championships held in Doha, Qatar. He did not finish his race.

See also
China at the 2012 Summer Olympics - Athletics
Athletics at the 2012 Summer Olympics – Men's 20 kilometres walk

References

Living people
1991 births
People from Qujing
Athletes from Yunnan
Chinese male racewalkers
Olympic athletes of China
Olympic silver medalists in athletics (track and field)
2016 Olympic silver medalists for China
Athletes (track and field) at the 2012 Summer Olympics
Athletes (track and field) at the 2016 Summer Olympics
Athletes (track and field) at the 2020 Summer Olympics
Athletes (track and field) at the 2014 Asian Games
World Athletics Championships athletes for China
Universiade medalists in athletics (track and field)
Olympic male racewalkers
Universiade silver medalists for China
Asian Games competitors for China
Medalists at the 2011 Summer Universiade